Sofie Flader (born 4 June 1996) is a Danish handball player who currently plays for Nykøbing Falster Håndboldklub in the Danish Women's Handball League.

References
 

1996 births
Living people
Handball players from Copenhagen
Danish female handball players
Nykøbing Falster Håndboldklub players